Marinos Tzionis (born 16 July 2001) is a Cypriot professional footballer who currently plays for Major League Soccer club Sporting Kansas City as a winger.

Career

Omonia 
On 26 September 2017, Tzionis signed his first contract as a professional footballer, joining Omonia.

Tzionis finished the 2017-18 season with just two appearances. However, in Summer 2018, the club underwent a change of ownership, and put a large emphasis on youth development. This resulted in Tzionis being given more opportunities the following season, which he took advantage of, scoring his first three goals for the club.

The 2020-21 season proved successful for player and team alike, as Tzionis helped Omonia win the Cypriot First Division for the first time in over a decade. He scored seven goals in the competition, many of which played a vital role in winning the league. In addition, he played his first continental games, including all six of Omonia's games in the 2021–22 Europa League group stage.

Tzionis scored his first goal in a European competition on 5 August 2021, in a 1-0 win over Flora Tallinn, in a Europa League qualifier.

Sporting Kansas City 
On 24 January 2022, MLS club Sporting Kansas City announced they had signed Tzionis on a three-year contract, for a reported fee of around €1.6 million.

Career statistics

Club

International goals

Honours
Omonia
Cypriot First Division: 2020–21
 Cypriot Super Cup: 2021

References

External links

Living people
2001 births
Cypriot footballers
Cyprus international footballers
Cyprus youth international footballers
People from Nicosia
AC Omonia players
Sporting Kansas City players
Association football midfielders
Cypriot expatriate footballers
Cypriot expatriate sportspeople in the United States
Expatriate soccer players in the United States
Major League Soccer players